The 2013 IHF Super Globe was the seventh edition. It was held in Doha, Qatar at the Al-Gharafa Sports Club Hall from 25–30 August 2013.

FC Barcelona won the title for the first time after defeating HSV Hamburg 27–25 in the final.

Teams
The teams that took part are the respectives continental champions:

 Sydney University
 HC Taubaté
 HSV Hamburg
 Al Rayyan
 Al Sadd
 El Jaish
 FC Barcelona (replaces Atlético Madrid)
 Étoile du Sahel

Draw

Seedings
The seedings were announced on 24 June with the draw being held at 27 July.

Preliminary round
The draw was held on July 27, 2013.

All times are local (UTC+3).

Group A

Group B

Knockout stage

5–8th place bracket

Semifinals

Seventh place game

Fifth place game

Championship bracket

Semifinals

Third place game

Final

Final ranking

References

External links
Official website

IHF Super Globe
2013 IHF Super Globe
IHF Super Globe
Sports competitions in Doha
International handball competitions hosted by Qatar